Dysdercus albofasciatus is a species of true bug in the family Pyrrhocoridae. It is found in Argentina, Brazil, Paraguay, and Uruguay.

References

Pyrrhocoridae
Insects described in 1878